Ángel Martínez Cervera (born 31 January 1986), known simply as Ángel, is a Spanish retired professional footballer who played as a midfielder.

He began his career with Espanyol, appearing in 59 competitive games and reaching the 2007 UEFA Cup Final. Subsequently, he played in England, starting out at Blackpool for whom he signed in 2011.

Club career

Espanyol
Born in Girona, Catalonia, Ángel was a product of RCD Espanyol's youth system. He appeared in seven La Liga matches with the first team during the 2006–07 season, the first on 11 March 2007 in a 1–1 away draw against Racing de Santander. He added two appearances in their runner-up run in the UEFA Cup, winning both games.

In the following campaign, Ángel was an important element in the Catalan side, scoring in wins at Sevilla FC (3–2) and CA Osasuna (2–1) and finishing with 28 league appearances. After Mauricio Pochettino's arrival as coach in January 2009, however, he was deemed surplus to requirements: after a loan move had been arranged until the end of the season with Segunda División club Gimnàstic de Tarragona, the deal collapsed as Espanyol did not sign, as originally intended, Argentine midfielder Oscar Ahumada before the 31st deadline.

Ángel was loaned to Rayo Vallecano in the second division for 2009–10, in a season-long move. He was a regular for the Madrid outskirts team, as they retained their status.

In late July 2010, still owned by Espanyol, Ángel signed with another club in that tier, hometown's Girona FC, sharing teams with his brother José. He made his official debut on 28 August, playing 68 minutes in a 4–2 home victory over CD Tenerife, and started in 25 of his league appearances – totalling nearly 2,000 minutes of play – during the season in an eventual 11th-place finish.

Blackpool
On 25 July 2011, Ángel signed a two-year contract with English Championship side Blackpool, which included an option for a third year. He made his official debut on 11 August in a penalty shootout loss against Sheffield Wednesday in the first round of the League Cup, and first appeared in the league on 27 September, in a 2–2 draw with Coventry City at the Ricoh Arena.

Toward the end of the season, Ángel became a regular starter for the Seasiders, with manager Ian Holloway saying of him: "He's growing into the country, he's learning to speak English and he's settled down now. Ludovic Sylvestre is really unlucky but I'd be crazy to leave out Ángel. He's almost the first name on the teamsheet at the moment." On 17 April 2012, the day after the manager's comments, he scored his first goal for the team in a 1–0 home win over Leeds United.

Ángel played 26 games in 2013–14, as Blackpool narrowly avoided relegation after finishing in 20th position. He was also chosen as the club's Community Player of the Year.

Millwall
On 2 September 2014, Ángel agreed to a one-year deal with fellow league club Millwall, reuniting with former Blackpool boss Holloway. He appeared in his first competitive game on 12 December, starting and playing 89 minutes in a 1–0 defeat of Brighton & Hove Albion.

Chesterfield
Ángel signed for Chesterfield on 16 August 2015, agreeing to a two-year deal. He picked up an anterior cruciate ligament knee injury in September, going on to be sidelined for 15 months.

Ángel returned to action for the Spireites on 13 December 2016, in their 8–0 win against Aston United for the DCFA Senior Challenge Cup.

Sabadell
Aged 31, Ángel returned to both his country and his native region, joining Segunda División B club CE Sabadell FC on 23 August 2017. Three days later, in the second round of the season, he came on as a 62nd-minute substitute in a 2–0 away win over UE Olot, with his sibling José playing the entire match for the opposition.

Ángel featured regularly during his spell at the Estadi de la Nova Creu Alta, helping to promote to the second division in 2020. On 3 June 2021, the 35-year-old retired from professional football.

International career
Ángel made three appearances for the Spain under-19 team in 2005, adding another three for the under-21s three years later.

Personal life
Ángel's older brother, José, was also a footballer. A defender, he played mainly with Girona, coinciding with his sibling in 2010–11.

Career statistics

Club

Honours
Espanyol
UEFA Cup runner-up: 2006–07

References

External links

1986 births
Living people
Sportspeople from Girona
Spanish footballers
Footballers from Catalonia
Association football midfielders
La Liga players
Segunda División players
Segunda División B players
Tercera División players
RCD Espanyol B footballers
RCD Espanyol footballers
Rayo Vallecano players
Girona FC players
CE Sabadell FC footballers
English Football League players
Blackpool F.C. players
Millwall F.C. players
Chesterfield F.C. players
Spain youth international footballers
Spain under-21 international footballers
Catalonia international footballers
Spanish expatriate footballers
Expatriate footballers in England
Spanish expatriate sportspeople in England